Hans Georg Herzog (May 7, 1915 – July 28, 2014) was a Romanian field handball player of German origin who competed in the 1936 Summer Olympics. He was part of the Romanian field handball team, which finished fifth in the Olympic tournament. He played one match. Herzog died in July 2014 at the age of 99.

References

1915 births
2014 deaths
Field handball players at the 1936 Summer Olympics
Olympic handball players of Romania
Romanian male handball players